Durnford School was an English preparatory school for boys which opened in 1894 on the Isle of Purbeck in Dorset.

The school occupied Durnford House, in the High Street of the village of Langton Matravers near Swanage, and was notoriously spartan and uncomfortable. "Strip and swim" was the morning ritual for the boys – watched by headmaster Thomas Pellatt – into the sea from Dancing Ledge on the coast in 1898. Later, Pellatt had quarrymen blast out a pool in the rocks of Dancing Ledge, for his pupils to swim in. Pellatt wrote his reminiscences in a book: Boys in the making 1936.
In 1939, during the Second World War, Durnford House was occupied by radar scientists; a map showing the location of the school is shown on a map of radar sites scattered throughout Dorset.
The Durnford boys were transferred to another prep school in the village, the Old Malthouse. In 1948, when the British army gave it up, Durnford House was acquired by the owners of the Old Malthouse. The main buildings were variously pulled down or sold, leaving the Old Malthouse with the grounds, which were levelled for playing fields.

War memorial
St George's Parish Church, Langton Matravers, has a war memorial containing 53 names of old boys of the school who died in the First World War. There is a further memorial to those killed in the Second World War, but without the names.

Notable former pupils

 Henry Egerton Cotton CBE, First Chancellor, (1992-93?) John Moores University, Lord Lieutenant of Merseyside (1989–92)
 Admiral Sir Geoffrey Oliver
 Sir Stephen Hastings MC, SAS, SOE, MP
 Nicholas Elliott, MI6 Intelligence Officer notable for his involvement with the Commander Lionel Crabb affair in the 1950s and the flight of traitor Kim Philby to Moscow in 1963.
 Ian Fleming author of the James Bond novels, who attended Durnford before Eton together with his brother Peter. The school was next to the estate of the Bond family whose motto is 'Non sufficit orbis' ('The World Is Not Enough'). The book For Your Eyes Only: Ian Fleming and James Bond by Ben Macintyre describes Durnford as a "traditionally brutal prep school". He claims it "epitomised the strange British faith in bad food, plenty of Latin and beatings from an early age". Macintyre quotes from a letter Fleming sent to his mother at the age of seven, saying: "My coff (sic) has grown to a whoping (sic) coff now. Don't tell Mr Pellatt (the headmaster) cause just this morning he said that nun (sic) of us had coffs. I am afraid that I do not like school very much." Macintyre adds that the school, which closed in the Second World War made Ian no more ill nor miserable than anyone else. The head's wife read to the pupils from popular fiction including John Buchan adventures, The Prisoner of Zenda and Bulldog Drummond yarns. Durnford School's buildings became a ramshackle out-station of the Air Research Establishment's Telecommunications Research Establishment, devising Britain's radar systems from 1940-42. Some were demolished soon afterwards although Durnford House still stands.
 Vice-Admiral Sir Gerard "Ged" Mansfield RN (Edward Gerard Napier Mansfield) was Deputy Supreme Allied Commander, Atlantic, based at Norfolk, Virginia, from 1973 to 1974. He was a descendant of Admiral Sir Charles John Napier.
Admiral of the Fleet John Tovey, 1st Baron Tovey (1885—1971)

References

Defunct schools in Dorset
Educational institutions established in 1894
1894 establishments in England